Marina Cooper is a fictional character on the popular CBS daytime soap opera, Guiding Light. The character is the only child of police chief, Frank Cooper, and ex-wife, Eleni Andros and was born on-screen on May 8, 1993.  In December 2001, her birth year was SORASed to 1985.  The character has been portrayed by six different actresses with Mandy Bruno currently playing the role on Guiding Light since May 24, 2004.

Character history
Marina became a police recruit after being accepted at Springfield's Police Academy following the footsteps of her father and aunt before her. Her love interest at the time, Danny Santos, was a former mobster. As of 2007, she became a detective.

In 2009, the character of Marina has become embroiled in the Edmund Winslow murder mystery and has been featured very prominently when she was thought to be his killer, even though he was revealed to be alive. Marina married A.C. Mallet but is confronted by the return of her ex-boyfriend Shayne Lewis. After adopting a son, Henry, with Mallet, it was soon revealed that Shayne and his girlfriend Lara were the child's biological parents. After annulling his marriage to Dinah, who fled town to avoid being charged with the murder of a man she thought was Edmund Winslow, Shayne wanted to become a real father to his son. Later, Mallet left town, because he didn't want his son to have two fathers, and left Marina to raise Henry with Shayne. After divorcing Mallet, Marina is shown with Shayne parenting Henry, they are possibly married.

Family
Marina is the only child of Frank Cooper and Eleni Andros, who married the same day of Marina's birth. They separated in 2000 as their workaholic personalities led them to drift apart. After Eleni's affair was discovered, they divorced; it was an event that Marina did not forgive her mother easily for. Though she moved away and lived with Eleni in Los Angeles after her parents' break-up, she returned in December 2001 after running away from California. Though her parents considered re-uniting for Marina's sake, Eleni eventually left Springfield once more acquiescing to Marina's desire to live with her family, garnering extremely negative reaction from fans because of the characters unpopularity.

References

External links
http://www.soapcentral.com/gl/whoswho/marina.php

Guiding Light characters
Fictional Greek people in television
Fictional American police officers
Television characters introduced in 1993